Sphulingo is a 2021 Bangladeshi film. The film is directed by Tauquir Ahmed and is produced by Shopner Bangladesh Foundation. It feature Shamol Mawla, Pori Moni, Rawnak Hasan and Zakia Bari Momo in the lead roles. The film released on Independence Day of Bangladesh across the county on 35 screens.

Cast
 Shamol Mawla as Partha
 Pori Moni as Diba 
 Rawnak Hasan as Asif
 Zakia Bari Momo as Airin
 Abul Hayat
 Mamunur Rashid
 Shahidul Alam Sachchu

Music
A song from the film titled, "Tomar Name", recently released on 14 February 2021.

References

External links
 Sphulingo at Bangla Movie Database
 

2021 films
2020s Bengali-language films
Bengali-language Bangladeshi films
Films directed by Tauquir Ahmed